The Brenham Municipal Airport is an airport serving the city of Brenham and the greater Washington County area. The airport is owned by the City of Brenham and operated by the Aviators Plus FBO. There is a diner in the airport's terminal named Dreamliner Diner.

History 

The City of Brenham began construction on the Brenham Municipal Airport in 1964, building a basic runway, apron, and taxiway. Thanks to further funding from the FAA and the City, a terminal and hangar building were added the following year. Over the years, upgrades and maintenance were underwent, mostly on the FAA's and TxDOT's dime.

Since 1997, seven private hangars have been built at the airport.

In the early 2000s, a new terminal was constructed thanks to a grant from TxDOT. This terminal included facilities for the fixed-base operator, and under the agreement with the FBO a restaurant was included in the construction. This restaurant became the Southern Flyer Diner, a 1950s-styled diner, and eventually became a tourist destination for aviators and non-aviators alike. Southern Flyer Diner was a popular destination for a $100 hamburger - a restaurant an amateur pilot will use as an excuse to fly, and spend a large amount of fuel in the process.

Due to the COVID-19 pandemic and decreased traffic at the airport, Southern Flyer Diner permanently closed in August of 2020. A new restaurant opened in its place in December of 2021, called Dreamliner Diner.

References 

Airports in Texas
Airports established in 1964